Weichai (Chongqing) Automotive is the subsidiary company wholly owned by Weichai Power Co., Ltd. since 2012.

Overview 
Weichai (Chongqing) Automotive was formerly named Chongqing Jialing Chuanjiang Automobile Manufacturing Co., Ltd, and was headquartered in Chongqing, China. It is a large automobile manufacturing enterprise, which is qualified to produce M1, M2, M3, N1, N2, N3 series vehicles.

Enranger (marque) 
In December, 2013, Weichai Auto officially launched the Enranger brand for the Chinese car market. Enranger is the English name, with the Chinese name being Yingzhi. Enranger is a brand that produces passenger vehicles including crossovers, MPVs, and pickup trucks. Production started in the second half of 2014 in an individual facility in Chongqing. Initial capacity was 100,000 cars per year which was planned to later be expanded to 300,000 annually. 
Current products include the following:

Enranger 737 - compact MPV (codenamed M301)
Enranger 737 EV - electric compact MPV
Enranger 727 - compact MPV (lower trim level of the 737)
Enranger G5 - compact crossover based on the 737
Enranger G3 - subcompact crossover (code named S201)
Enranger EX1 - mini crossover
Enranger P80 - pickup truck

VGV (marque) 
On November 27, 2019, Weichai Motor released a new brand called VGV alongside the brand's first model, the Weichai U70. Different from the previous Enranger brand, the VGV uses the logo of China National Heavy Duty Truck Group and serves as the light passenger brand of the group. According to Chai Wei, deputy general manager of Weichai (Chongqing) Automobile Co., Ltd., The launch of Weichai VGV U70 will open the strategic layout of Weichai Group's light vehicles, which means that Weichai Group's competitive chips in the field of independent car brands will be raised again. The VGV U70 spawned several variants of the crossover SUV including an ute.

VGV U70
VGV U75 Plus
VGV VX7

References 

Weichai Group
Car manufacturers of China
Vehicle manufacturing companies established in 2012
Chinese companies established in 2012
Enranger
Car brands